Michał Jan Żebrowski (born 17 June 1972) is a Polish actor and singer. He was the first actor to portray Geralt of Rivia, in the movie The Hexer.

Filmography

Film

Television

Video games

Discography

Studio albums

Other

Music videos

References

External links

1972 births
Living people
Male actors from Warsaw
Polish male film actors
Polish male television actors
Polish pop singers
Polish male voice actors
Polish male video game actors
20th-century Polish  male singers
21st-century Polish male singers
21st-century Polish singers
Aleksander Zelwerowicz National Academy of Dramatic Art in Warsaw alumni